Steen Malte Willadsen (born 1943 in Copenhagen, Denmark) is a Danish biologist credited with being the first to clone a mammal using nuclear transfer.

Willadsen graduated from the Royal Veterinary College of Copenhagen (1969), and received a PhD in reproductive physiology from there (1973). In 1984, at the British Agricultural Research Council's Institute of Animal Physiology, Cambridge, he successfully used cells from early embryos  to clone sheep by nuclear transfer. The procedure he developed was essentially the one used a decade later by Wilmut et al. to produce Dolly, the sheep, although in the latter case, nuclei from a mature sheep, i.e. not from sheep embryos, were used. Prior to the nuclear transfer experiments, Willadsen had developed methods for freezing sheep and cow embryos, and embryo manipulation methods for producing genetically identical animals, primarily identical twins in sheep, cattle, pigs, and horses, and for producing mammalian chimaeras, including interspecies chimaeras.

References

External links
Scientist Profile : Steen Willadsen

Living people
1943 births
Danish scientists